Mehsana are a breed of water buffalo from the state of Gujarat, India. Mixture of murrah and surti blood. They are raised for milk production, and are known as one of the best milk breeds in India. They are named for the town of Mehsana, in northern Gujarat, where these buffalo are still concentrated.

References

Water buffalo breeds originating in India
Mehsana district
Animal husbandry in Gujarat